The All-Ireland Senior Hurling Championship of 1977 was the 91st staging of Ireland's premier hurling knock-out competition.  Cork won the championship, beating Wexford 1–17 to 3–8 in the final at Croke Park, Dublin.

The championship

Format

Munster Championship

First round: (1 match) This is a single match between the first two teams drawn from the province of Munster.  One team is eliminated at this stage while the winners advance to the semi-finals.

Semi-finals: (2 matches) The winner of the first round joins the other three Munster teams to make up the semi-final pairings.  Two teams are eliminated at this stage while the winners advance to the final.

Final: (1 match) The winner of the two semi-finals contest this game.  One team is eliminated at this stage while the winners advance to the All-Ireland semi-final.

Leinster Championship

First round: (2 matches) These are two matches between the first four teams drawn from the province of Leinster.  Two teams are eliminated at this stage while the winners advance to the semi-finals.

Semi-finals: (2 matches) The winners of the two first-round games join the other two Leinster teams to make up the semi-final pairings.  Two teams are eliminated at this stage while the winners advance to the final.

Final: (1 match) The winners of the two semi-finals contest this game.  One team is eliminated at this stage while the winners advance to the All-Ireland final.

All-Ireland Championship

Quarter-final: (1 match) This is a single match between Galway and the winners of the All-Ireland 'B' championship.  One team is eliminated at this stage while the winners advance to the semi-final.

Semi-final: (1 match) This is a single match between the Munster champions and the winners of the quarter-final.  One team is eliminated at this stage while the winners advance to the final.

Final: (1 match) The winners of the semi-final and the Leinster champions contest this game.

Fixtures

Leinster Senior Hurling Championship

Munster Senior Hurling Championship

All-Ireland Senior Hurling Championship

Championship statistics

Miscellaneous

 At the Munster final between Cork and Clare, three armed men entered the unguarded room, held up the Munster Council treasurer, Tadhg Crowley, and his assistants, and got away with £24,520.
 A dispute in manning levels resulted in two RTÉ cameramen refusing to film the Leinster final between Wexford and Kilkenny.

Player facts

Debutantes
The following players made their début in the 1977 championship:

Retirees
The following players played their last game in the 1977 championship:

Top scorers

Season

Single game

Broadcasting

The following matches were broadcast live on television in Ireland on RTÉ.

See also